Innerworld is the first full-length studio album by synth-pop band Electric Youth. The album was released in Canada by Last Gang Records and in the rest of the world by Secretly Canadian on September 30, 2014.

NPR premiered the album via their "First Listen" program on September 20, 2014.

The album was recorded in Toronto and Los Angeles and was produced by Electric Youth.  Vince Clarke and Peter Mayes provided additional production and Mayes also mixed the album.

The album artwork features Electric Youth's Austin Garrick and Bronwyn Griffin, as painted by English painter Paul Roberts.

Track listing

References

2014 debut albums
Electric Youth albums